Artur Siemaszko (born 6 January 1997) is a Polish professional footballer who plays as a forward for Puszcza Niepołomice, on loan from Arka Gdynia.

Career
On 17 June 2019, Siemaszko returned to Stomil Olsztyn on a permanent transfer.

On 31 July 2020, he signed a three-year contract with Arka Gdynia. On 30 June 2022, he was sent out on a one-year loan to Puszcza Niepołomice.

References

External links
 
 

1997 births
Sportspeople from Olsztyn
Living people
Polish footballers
Poland youth international footballers
Association football forwards
Zagłębie Lubin players
OKS Stomil Olsztyn players
GKS Tychy players
Arka Gdynia players
Puszcza Niepołomice players
Ekstraklasa players
I liga players
III liga players